Safe House is a 2012 American action thriller film directed by Daniel Espinosa, written by David Guggenheim, and starring Denzel Washington and Ryan Reynolds. The film follows Matt Weston (Reynolds), a CIA officer on a low-level posting in Cape Town, South Africa, who is in charge of a safe house where the CIA is interrogating Tobin Frost (Washington), a veteran operative who has allegedly betrayed the agency. When the safe house is attacked by mercenaries, Weston flees with Frost in his charge. As the team of killers, who seem to be one step ahead of the pair, track them throughout Cape Town, Weston wonders who to trust. Vera Farmiga, Brendan Gleeson, Sam Shepard, Rubén Blades, Nora Arnezeder and Robert Patrick co-star.

Safe House was Espinosa's first English-language film. Filming took place on location in Cape Town. The film premiered in New York City on February 7, 2012, and was released in U.S. theaters on February 10, 2012, by Universal Pictures. The film earned mixed reviews, with praise for Washington and Reynolds' performances, but negative criticisms for the screenplay and the editing of the action scenes. Nevertheless, Safe House was a commercial success, earning $208 million worldwide against an $85 million budget.

Plot
In Cape Town, South Africa, junior CIA officer Matt Weston is serving as a "housekeeper", an operative in charge of securing and maintaining a local CIA safe house. He is frustrated due to the lack of action at his location, and hopes to move to Paris to follow his live-in girlfriend Ana, a young French physician about to start her residency.

Elsewhere in Cape Town, ex-CIA NOC operative-turned criminal Tobin Frost acquires a data storage device from rogue MI6 officer Alec Wade. A team of mercenaries attacks and kills Wade, forcing Frost to surrender to the American consulate. A team led by veteran CIA agent Daniel Kiefer transfer Frost to Weston's safe house to interrogate him. When the mercenaries, led by Vargas, attack the safe house and kill Kiefer's team, Weston escapes with Frost.

Weston contacts his supervisor, David Barlow, at CIA headquarters in Langley, Virginia, along with Catherine Linklater, the operative in charge of Frost's interrogation, and CIA Deputy Director Harlan Whitford, who is overseeing the operation. Linklater orders Weston to lie low and await further instructions. But Frost begins to manipulate Weston, insisting that someone within the CIA gave away their location to the mercenaries and that Weston is in peril. Barlow tells Weston to go to Cape Town Stadium where he retrieves a GPS device containing the location of another safe house, but Frost creates a diversion and eludes him. When Weston is detained by the police, he is forced to fire at them to escape.

Weston contacts Langley to report Frost's escape. After hearing that Weston fired at the police, Linklater orders him to the nearest American embassy while Linklater and Barlow travel to South Africa. When Whitford uses a phrase, "we'll take it from here," that Frost warned him about earlier, Weston decides to pursue Frost himself. Weston meets with Ana, admits he is CIA, and urges her to return to Paris to protect her.

Weston tracks Frost to a township in Langa, where Frost obtains travel documents from Carlos Villar, an old friend. Vargas' team attacks again, killing Carlos and his family, but Weston helps Frost escape. Weston brutally interrogates one of Vargas' wounded mercenaries, who reveals that Vargas is working for the CIA, which is seeking to retrieve the storage device from Frost. As they bandage their wounds, Frost urges Weston not to kill innocent people, telling the story of how he was forced to kill an air traffic controller while on a mission to cover up wetwork committed by the CIA.

Weston takes Frost to the new safe house, where Weston keeps the housekeeper, Keller, at gunpoint. Keller attacks and severely wounds Weston before Weston kills him. Frost reveals to Weston that the device contains evidence of corruption and bribery involving the CIA, MI6, and other intelligence agencies, put together by the Mossad, before leaving.

Meanwhile, Barlow kills Linklater and arrives at the safe house where he reveals that he is Vargas' employer. The file contains incriminating evidence against Barlow, who encourages Weston to lie about what has happened. Frost returns and kills Vargas' team but is fatally wounded by Barlow. Weston then shoots and kills Barlow. As he dies, Frost gives Weston the file, saying he is a better man than Frost.

Back in the United States, Weston meets with Director Whitford, who informs Weston that unflattering facts about the CIA must be removed from his report, but that he will be promoted. He asks Weston about the file's location, but Weston denies knowing about it. Whitford states that whoever has those files will have many enemies. Weston assures Whitford that he will "take it from here,“ shaking Whitford's hand and leaving. He leaks the files to the media, incriminating personnel from many intelligence agencies, including Whitford. Weston travels to Paris and covertly observes Ana while she sits with friends in a cafe. She notices him across the street and smiles before he walks away.

Cast

 Denzel Washington as Tobin Frost
 Ryan Reynolds as Matt Weston
 Vera Farmiga as Catherine Linklater
 Brendan Gleeson as David Barlow
 Sam Shepard as Harlan Whitford
 Rubén Blades as Carlos Villar
 Nora Arnezeder as Ana Moreau
 Robert Patrick as Daniel Kiefer
 Liam Cunningham as Alec Wade
 Joel Kinnaman as Keller
 Fares Fares as Vargas

Soundtrack

Ramin Djawadi composed the score to the film.

Track listing
All music by Ramin Djawadi.

Songs used in the film but not included in the soundtrack album were:
 "Rebel Blues" performed by Lëk Sèn
 "No Church in the Wild" performed by Kanye West & Jay-Z featuring Frank Ocean

Release
The film premiered in New York City on February 7, 2012, and was released in U.S. theaters on February 10, 2012. Safe House was released to Blu-ray and DVD on June 5, 2012 in the United States.

Reception

Box office
Safe House grossed $126.4 million in the United States, and $81.7 million in other territories, for a worldwide total of $208.1 million.

Safe House earned $13.6 million on opening day, and a total of $40.2 million over the weekend, finishing second behind The Vow. The film was the second-biggest opener for Washington, behind American Gangster ($43.6 million), and third-best for Reynolds behind X-Men Origins: Wolverine ($85.1 million) and Green Lantern ($53.2 million), respectively. In its second weekend, it finished first $23.6 million. It became the second film in 2012 to cross the $100 million mark domestically after The Vow and the fourth film to cross the mark worldwide after Underworld: Awakening, Journey 2: The Mysterious Island, and The Vow.

Critical response
On review aggregator website Rotten Tomatoes, the film has an approval rating of 53% based on 194 reviews; the average rating is 5.70/10. The site's consensus reads, "Safe House stars Washington and Reynolds are let down by a thin script and choppily edited action sequences." On Metacritic the film holds an average weighted score of 52 out of 100 based on 36 critics, indicating "mixed or average reviews". Audiences polled by CinemaScore gave the film an average grade of "A−" on an A+ to F scale.

Future
In September 2012, it was announced that Universal had hired screenwriter David Guggenheim to write a script for a possible sequel.

References

External links
 
 
 

2012 films
2012 action thriller films
2010s spy films
American action thriller films
South African action thriller films
2010s English-language films
English-language South African films
Films about the Central Intelligence Agency
Films set in Cape Town
Films shot in South Africa
Relativity Media films
Techno-thriller films
Universal Pictures films
Films directed by Daniel Espinosa
Films produced by Scott Stuber
Films scored by Ramin Djawadi
2010s American films